Hackers Are People Too is a 2008 documentary film about the hacker community, written and directed by Ashley Shwartau. The film was recorded at DEF CON conference.

References

External links

2008 films
Hacking (computer security)
Computing culture
Documentary films about the Internet
Hacker culture
Works about computer hacking
2000s English-language films